The Aeroprakt A-24 Viking is a Ukrainian three-seat light-sport amphibian designed for home building and marketed in kit form by Aeroprakt.

Design and development
The Viking is a strut-braced high-wing monoplane amphibian. A Rotax 912ULS piston engine driving a tractor propeller is mounted on the leading edge of the wing above the cabin. The enclosed cabin has side-by-side seating with an additional single seat behind, the rear seat can be removed to fit luggage. It has a retractable landing gear with the main wheels moving above the water line on the fuselage side rather than retracting into the fuselage.

The design uses the same airfoil as the Antonov An-2 biplane, a TsAGI R-11 (14%).

No regular production was ongoing in 2015 and the aircraft was at that time only produced on request.

Specifications

See also

References

Notes

External links 

 

2000s Ukrainian ultralight aircraft
Viking
Amphibious aircraft
High-wing aircraft
Single-engined tractor aircraft
Flying boats